Geoffrey Colin Shephard is a mathematician who works on convex geometry and reflection groups. He asked Shephard's problem on the volumes of projected convex bodies, posed another problem on polyhedral nets, proved the Shephard–Todd theorem in invariant theory of finite groups, began the study of complex polytopes, and classified the complex reflection groups.

Shephard earned his Ph.D. in 1954 from Queens' College, Cambridge, under the supervision of J. A. Todd. He was a professor of mathematics at the University of East Anglia until his retirement.

Selected publications

References

External links
Photo from Oberwolfach

Year of birth missing (living people)
Living people
20th-century British mathematicians
21st-century British mathematicians
Alumni of Queens' College, Cambridge
Academics of the University of East Anglia